Älgarås is a locality situated in Töreboda Municipality, Västra Götaland County, Sweden with 417 inhabitants in 2010. The battle of Älgarås, between the House of Sverker and House of Erik took place here in 1205, securing the crown for Sverker II of Sweden for some more years, until the battle of Lena in 1208.

References 

Populated places in Västra Götaland County
Populated places in Töreboda Municipality